Komnzo (also Kómnzo, Kómnjo, Kamundjo) is a Yam language of Papua New Guinea spoken by 150–250 people in the village of Rouku and the town of Morehead.

Phonology

Consonants 
The consonant inventory comprises 18 phonemes (ᵐb, t, ⁿd, k, ᵑɡ, kʷ, ᵑɡʷ, m, n, ŋ, ɸ, ʦ, ⁿʣ, ð, s, r, w, j). The system consists of a series of obstruents (oral and prenasalized plosives and affricates), fricatives, nasals and semivowels. Consonants occurring only in loanwords are: b, g, d, l.

Vowels 
The vowel inventory consists of eight phonemes (i, e, æ, a, ʏ, ø, u, o) and one epenthetic vowel (ə̯).

Epenthesis 
Komnzo phonology exhibits widespread vowel epenthesis. The epenthetic vowel is usually a short schwa (ə̯), sometimes a short high front or high back vowel. Many syllables and many words in Komnzo lack a specified vowel, e.g. mnz 'house' [mə̯nts] or gwth 'nest' [ᵑɡʷə̯θ].

Orthography 

In the tables above, graphemes are indicated by <angle brackets>. The current orthography of Komnzo does not represent the epenthetic vowel because it can be predicted by the rules of syllabification. This leads to orthographic representations which untrained users might find hard to pronounce, for example: zfth 'reason' is pronounced [tsə̯ɸə̯θ] or fta '36' is pronounced [ɸə̯ta].

Numeral system
Komnzo number words use a seximal (senary) numeral system, with the following numerals: nibo (61), fta (62), taruba (63), damno (64), wärämäkä (65) and wi (66). Counting in larger quantities is restricted to a ritualized counting procedure, whereby yam tubers are counted publicly for exchange feasts. For everyday counting above six, English numerals are borrowed.

Notes

References
Döhler, Christian (2013) "Don't talk to him! His family speaks a bit mixed." Multilingualism from the perspective of the documenter. presentation at the 3rd International Conference on Language Documentation and Conservation (ICLDC).  Accessed on 2019-11-12.
 
 
Evans, Nicholas, I Wayan Arka, Matthew Carroll, Christian Döhler, Eri Kashima, Emil Mittag, Kyla Quinn, Jeff Siegel, Philip Tama & Charlotte van Tongeren. (2017) The languages of Southern New Guinea. In Bill Palmer (ed.), The languages and linguistics of the New Guinea area, 641–774. Berlin; Boston: Walter de Gruyter. . Accessed on 2019-11-12.

External links
 Nen and Kómnzo: Two languages of Southern New Guinea (2017) DOBES language documentation project. Accessed on 2019-11-12.
 Komnzo language (2018) Zenodo data repository. Accessed on 2019-11-12.
 Komnzo DoReCo corpus compiled by Christian Döhler. Audio recordings of narrative texts with transcriptions time-aligned at the phone level, translations, and time-aligned morphological annotations.

Tonda languages
Languages of Western Province (Papua New Guinea)